The Canada national indoor lacrosse team represents Canada in international tournaments of indoor lacrosse.  It is the best national box lacrosse team in the world, having won all five World Indoor Lacrosse Championships, starting with the 
2003 ILF World Indoor Lacrosse Championship held in Canada. Team Canada has never lost a game in the tournament. Their biggest rivals are the Iroquois Nationals, who have finished in second place in all four tournaments.

Team Canada consists of primarily professional players from the National Lacrosse League. Many players also play Major Series Lacrosse or in the Western Lacrosse Association.

World Indoor Lacrosse Championship

2003
The first World Indoor Lacrosse Championship was held in Toronto, Ontario, Canada. Canada entered the tournament as the favourite to win. They went through the six-team group without any losses. In the semifinals they beat Team USA. Team Canada, led by captain Jim Veltman, won the gold medal match against Iroquois Nationals 21-4 and became the first World Indoor Lacrosse Champions.

2007

The second World Indoor Lacrosse Championship was held in Canada again, this time in Halifax. The tournament was divided in two groups of four teams. Canada met Ireland, Australia and the United States in group play. They prevailed in all three matches to reach the semifinals, where they would meet England. Canada won 24-8 to move to the final, where they met the Iroquois Nationals again. Canada was down during the second and third quarters, but thanks to two goals from John Grant, Jr., they ended up taking the game to overtime. After thirty seconds, Jeff Zywicki scored his first goal of the game, so Team Canada could be crowned as the World Champion again.

2011
The 2011 FIL World Indoor Lacrosse Championship was held in the Czech Republic, the first time the tournament was held outside of Canada. The format of the tournament remained the same and the Canadians met Australia, England and Slovakia in group play. Canada went through unbeaten again. They beat Team USA 15-10 in the semifinal. In the final, they met the Iroquois Nationals again, and won 13-6.

2015
The Onondaga Nation near Syracuse, New York hosted the 2015 WILC. Once again, the Canadian team went undefeated and took gold while the Iroquois took the silver and the United States bronze.

Results

Heritage Cup results
Since 2002, the Canadian national team has challenged for the Heritage Cup on four occasions, winning three times.

1985 IBLA North American Cup
A 15-game exhibition series was scheduled to be played by Team Canada and Team USA to kick-start the newly formed International Box Lacrosse Association.  Only eight games would end up being played with Canada winning 7-1.

January 26 - Rochester - Canada 19 - USA 9
February 2 - Philadelphia - USA 19 - Canada 17
February 9 - Syracuse - Canada 16 - 12
February ? - Baltimore - Canada 14 - USA 10
February 17 - Norfolk, VA - Canada won over USA
February 24 - Providence, RI - CANCELLED
March 1 - Peterborough - Canada 20 - USA 13
??? - Troy, NY - Canada won over USA
April 13 - Philadelphia - Canada 17 - USA 12
April 21 - Montreal - CANCELLED

References

External links
Official website of Canada's Senior Men's Box team
Official website of Canadian Lacrosse Association

Lacrosse teams in Canada
National lacrosse teams
lacrosse